Hillsdale is an unincorporated community in Scott Township, Vanderburgh County, in the U.S. state of Indiana.

Its main feature is a commercial center consisting of a Beuhler's IGA, a Subway, Gracie's Chinese Cuisine, Noble Romans, a Fifth-Third Bank, a Heritage Federal Credit Union, a driving school, and a Papa John's Pizza location.

Geography

References

Unincorporated communities in Vanderburgh County, Indiana
Unincorporated communities in Indiana